Agos (International title: Stream of Life / ) is a Philippine television drama series broadcast by GMA Network. The series is the third installment of Now and Forever. Directed by Mac Alejandre, it stars Sunshine Dizon, Dennis Trillo, Tanya Garcia, Lani Mercado and Christopher de Leon. It premiered on October 24, 2005 replacing Ganti. The series concluded on January 6, 2006 with a total of 55 episodes. It was replaced by Tinig in its timeslot.

Cast and characters

Lead cast
 Christopher de Leon as Armando
 Lani Mercado as Olivia
 Tanya Garcia as Sophia
 Sunshine Dizon as Erika
 Dennis Trillo as Danilo

Supporting cast
 JC de Vera as Julius
 Pauleen Luna as Clarissa / Cristina
 Polo Ravales as Pablo

Recurring cast
 Bella Flores as Consuelo
 Daniel Fernando as Ariel
 Juan Rodrigo as Ricardo
 Mon Confiado as Edwin
 Ynez Veneracion as Rhoda
 Odette Khan as Minerva
 Jeffrey Santos as Egay
 Tony Mabesa as Blanco
 Rich Vergara as Greg
 Ella Guevara as Jane
 Czarina de Leon as Monette

Guest cast
 Joyce Ching as young Erika

References

External links
 

2005 Philippine television series debuts
2006 Philippine television series endings
Filipino-language television shows
GMA Network drama series
Philippine romance television series
Television shows set in the Philippines